Top 40 may refer to:

Top 40, the current, 40 most-popular songs in a particular genre. It is the best-selling or most frequently broadcast popular music. 
Top 40 (radio format), or Contemporary hit radio, also known as CHR, contemporary hits, hit list, current hits, hit music, top 40, or pop radio) is a radio format that focuses on playing current and recurrent popular music as determined by the top 40 music charts. 
Top 40 Hits, 1995 album by Anal Cunt
Top 40 Music Magazine, English-language South African monthly music magazine published nationwide in print form between 1984 and 2002

Country-specific Top 40s
Dutch Top 40
HR Top 40, the main Croatian domestic singles airplay chart
Ö3 Austria Top 40, official Austrian singles chart
The Official NZ Top 40, New Zealand singles chart
UK Top 40 (TV series), charts-based programme which aired on Sundays  on the CBBC channel from 2002 to 2005

See also
Adult Top 40, also known as Adult Pop Songs, a chart published weekly by Billboard magazine and ranks the most popular adult top 40 as based on radio airplay
American Top 40 (commonly abbreviated to AT40), an internationally syndicated, independent song countdown radio program created by Casey Kasem, Don Bustany, Tom Rounds and Ron Jacobs
Mainstream Top 40, called Pop Songs and sometimes referred to as Top 40/CHR, a 40-song music chart published weekly by Billboard Magazine which ranks the most popular songs being played on a panel of Top 40 radio stations in the United States
Top 40 Tracks, a chart from Billboard magazine
Rick Dees Weekly Top 40, an internationally syndicated radio program created and hosted by American radio personality Rick Dees

Disambiguations
Top Ten (disambiguation)